Léon Lefèvre (born 28 November 1904, date of death unknown) was a Luxembourgian footballer. He played in eight matches for the Luxembourg national football team between 1922 and 1927.

References

External links

1904 births
Year of death missing
Luxembourgian footballers
Luxembourg international footballers
Place of birth missing
Association football forwards
CA Spora Luxembourg players